Bertrand Cheret (born 23 May 1937) is a French sailor who competed in the 1968 Summer Olympics and in the 1972 Summer Olympics.

References

1937 births
Living people
French male sailors (sport)
Olympic sailors of France
Sailors at the 1968 Summer Olympics – Flying Dutchman
Sailors at the 1972 Summer Olympics – Soling
20th-century French people